OverBlog is a blogging service from company Ebuzzing (from the merger of OverBlog and Ebuzzing). The company was founded in 2004 by Frédéric Montagnon, Gilles Moncaubeig and Julien Romanetto in Toulouse, France.
Originally launched in October 2004, OverBlog reaches 62 million uniques in February 2014 according to Quantcast.

OverBlog launched in the US during Blog World 2012.
The service is available in English, Spanish, French, Italian and German.

Fimalac’s Webedia acquires Overblog from Ebuzzing & Teads early in 2014.

References

External links 
OverBlog website
An example of Bilingual blog on Overblog

Internet properties established in 2004
Blog hosting services
Blog software